Sheba is a rural settlement northeast of Barberton in the Mpumalanga province of South Africa. It is situated in the De Kaap Valley and is fringed by the Makhonjwa Mountains. On Census 2011 maps it is marked as Bonanza Gold Mine, the name of an old worked-out mine.

References 

Populated places in the Mbombela Local Municipality